The initialism VFS can mean:

Valley Fault System, a dextral strike-slip fault in the Philippines.
Vancouver Film School, a school in Vancouver, British Columbia, Canada
Vancouver Film Studios, a film production centre in Vancouver, British Columbia
 Viafiers federalas svizras, the Romansh term for Swiss Federal Railways, the Swiss national railway.
Versioning file system, a file system which provides for the concurrent existence of several versions of a file
Vertical Flight Society, a United States based society for the advancement of vertical flight
Vertical formation skydiving, is a subcategory of formation skydiving using high-speed body positions normally associated with freeflying
Virtual file system, a file system acting as an abstraction layer on top of a more concrete file system
Visa Facilitation Services, an organization in India for processing visa applications